The Newag Dragon is a Polish six-axle electric locomotive, designed for working freight trains up to 4500 tons. The locomotive is built by Newag, between 2009–2016 at its Gliwice plant, since 2017 at the Nowy Sącz plant. By April 2020, 42 units had been built and delivered to 12 different train operating companies in Poland.

History

Origin
Newag Dragon's project is the first Polish electric locomotive project for 19 years, since the hitherto last Polish-designed locomotive, EM10, was unveiled. The idea to design and offer a six-axle goods locomotive came around as the company was engaged in refurbishing old ET22 six-axle goods locomotives and decided that it would make more sense to offer a new locomotive rather than a wide-ranging refurbishment.

Prototype production
From 2002 no electric locomotives were produced in Poland until September 2006, when an agreement was signed with the Ministry of Science and Higher Education for funding a project to build a new locomotive. It was decided to produce a heavy goods locomotive. The company also decided to produce a six-axle locomotive so that it could operate on a wider variety of tracks. The project for the locomotive was prepared in cooperation with EC Engineering and the Institute of Electrical Engineering. The traction engines were designed by the Research and Development Centre of Electrical Machines Komel and built by the Department of Electrical Machines Emit.

Presentations and tests

From 13 January to 30 December 2011 the supervised operation prototype unit, was led by STK, PKP Cargo, Pol-Miedz Trans and Lotos Kolej, under which E6ACT-001 had been in service for a combined 77 866 km with a maximum train weight of 4 021 t. In October, the locomotive was re-launched at the Trako Trade Fair in Gdańsk. On 23 December the Railway Transport Office issued a perpetual license for the service of the locomotive. In February 2012 promotional operation was taken by DB Schenker Rail Poland.  At the InnoTrans Trade Fair in September 2014 the locomotive of the E6ACT-008 series belonging to Lotos Kolej was shown.

In July 2018 the Dragon 2 was introduced by Newag, a slightly revised design that carried the designation E6ACTa. Three units were immediately purchased by PKP Cargo and delivered in October 2018. They bear PKP-style designations ET25-001 through -003.

Deliveries 

d – subtype designates a dual-power option (auxiliary 540 kilowatt diesel engine primarily for shunting)
a – subtype designates a revised design marketed as "Dragon 2"

Construction

Available versions

The locomotives are available in the following versions:
3 kV DC (type E6ACT, previously E6DCU).
15 kV 16.7 Hz and/or 25 kV 50 Hz (type E6ACU).
3 kV DC, and 15 and/or 25 kV AC (type E6MSU).
Diesel (version with lower power and lower maximum speed at full load).

The manufacturer also provides 2 options:
Max load – increasing the tractive effort to 450 kN.
Dual power – an auxiliary diesel engine.

E6ACT

Power supply

The E6ACT locomotive is designed to operate at a supply voltage of 3 kV DC. The locomotive's power electronics is based on IGBT technology. The first unit is powered by 6 STX500-4A electric motors, developing 834 kW each, powered by traction converters developed by the Institute of Electrical Engineering. The gear axle SET 553 is supplied by Voith. The locomotives are equipped with disc brakes. There are also multisystem models on offer.

Capabilities

The E6ACT/E6ACU locomotive has a continuous power output of 5,004 MW and a starting tractive effort of 375 kN, enabling it to pull 4,000 tonnes of cargo – or 4,500 with Max Load option.

References

Standard gauge locomotives of Poland
Electric locomotives of Poland
3000 V DC locomotives
15 kV AC locomotives
25 kV AC locomotives
Co′Co′ electric locomotives of Europe